Yaransk (Yaraň) is a town and the administrative center of Yaransky District in Kirov Oblast, Russia, located on the Yaran River (Vyatka's basin),  southwest of Kirov, the administrative center of the oblast. Population:

History
In the Middle Ages, it had a central position in the land of Mari and served as the capital of the Mari people. In 1584, Yaransk was founded as a Russian fortress on the Yaran River where the old Mari fortress once stood to defend against the Mari. A posad later grew around the fortress. Town status was granted to Yaransk in 1780.

Administrative and municipal status
Within the framework of administrative divisions, Yaransk serves as the administrative center of Yaransky District. As an administrative division, it is, together with eighteen rural localities, incorporated within Yaransky District as the Town of Yaransk. As a municipal division, the Town of Yaransk is incorporated within Yaransky Municipal District as Yaranskoye Urban Settlement.

References

Notes

Sources

Cities and towns in Kirov Oblast
Yaransky Uyezd